Auditorio is the first station of Line 1 of Guadalajara's light rail system from north to south, and the twentieth in the opposite direction. This station is underground.

This station is located under the intersection of Calzada Federalismo with Tratado of Tlatelolco street, in the municipality of Zapopan. Its construction was carried out together with that of a ramp that comes to the surface, which is used as a parking lot for trains and as a return to change from south-north to the opposite direction. This new station is the new terminus of Line 1 and is part of the renovation and expansion project for said line. The station was completed more than a year and a half ago and was inaugurated on November 22, 2018.

On November 26, 2018, there was a failure during the change of tracks located forward of the station, so the station was closed to fix the change of tracks, and it was reopened on November 28, 2018.

This station is located near the Arroyo Hondo and Tabachines neighborhoods, so it will serve to relieve a growing area of the city. The station's logo is a stylized image of the Benito Juárez Auditorium from which it takes its name and which is the venue for Guadalajara's Fiestas de Octubre.

Points of interest 

 Benito Juárez Auditorium (Fiestas de Octubre)
 Auditorio Municipal Market
 General Directorate of Public Safety, Civil Protection and Firefighters of Zapopan
 Green Cross Federalismo
 Freeway to Saltillo

Gallery

References 

Guadalajara light rail system Line 1 stations
Railway stations opened in 2018
2018 establishments in Mexico
Railway stations located underground in Mexico